Arrowhead Ranch is a populated place situated in the city of Glendale in Maricopa County, Arizona, United States. Arrowhead Ranch is a former citrus farm. It was purchased for development in 1978 and annexed by Glendale in 1979.

References

External links
 Arrowhead Ranch Phase I Homeowners Association
 Arrowhead Ranch Phase II Homeowners Association
 Hearthstone Estates – Arrowhead Ranch Phase IV Homeowners Association
 Sierra Verde – Arrowhead Ranch Phase V Homeowners Association

Populated places in Maricopa County, Arizona